The Men's handball at the 2010 Asian Games was held in Guangzhou, Guangdong, China from November 13 to 26, 2010. In this tournament, 11 teams played.

Squads

Results 
All times are China Standard Time (UTC+08:00)

Preliminary round

Group A

Group B

Placement 5th–10th

Placement 9th–10th

Placement 7th–8th

Placement 5th–6th

Final round

Semifinals

Bronze medal match

Gold medal match

Final standing

References

Results

External links 
 Handball Site of 2010 Asian Games 

Handball at the 2010 Asian Games